Blekinge County in Sweden held a county council election on 19 September 2010 on the same day as the general and municipal elections.

Results
There were 47 seats, the same number as in 2006. The Social Democrats won the most seats at 20, a loss of one seat. The party received 38.9% of a valid vote of 98,646.

Municipal results

References

Elections in Blekinge County
Blekinge